Shrigonda is a Municipal council city in Ahmednagar District in the Indian state of Maharashtra.

Governance
Shrigonda is a Municipal Council city in district of Ahmadnagar, Maharashtra. The city is divided into 17 wards for which elections are held every 5 years.

Demographics 
The area has a population of 31,134 of which 16,048 are men while 15,086 are women according to the 2011 census of India.

Municipal Council election

References 

Municipal councils in Maharashtra